Timo is a masculine given name. It is primarily used in Finnish, Estonian, Dutch and German societies. It may be used as an abbreviation of Timothy.

Arts and entertainment
Timo Alakotila (born 1959), Finnish musician
Timo Andres (born 1985), American composer and pianist
Timo Blunck (born 1962), German musician
Timo Boll (born 1981), German table tennis player
Timo Bortolotti (1889–1951), Italian sculptor
Timo Brunke (born 1972), German slam poet
Timo Descamps (born 1986), Belgian actor and musician
Timo Ellis (born 1970), American musician and record producer
Timo Pieni Huijaus (born 1982), a Finnish rapper 
Timo Jurkka (born 1963), Finnish actor
Timo Kahilainen (born 1963), Finnish actor
Timo Kahlen (born 1966), German sound sculptor and media artist
Timo Kojo (born 1953), Finnish singer
Timo Koivusalo (born 1963), Finnish actor, writer, and musician
Timo Korhonen (born 1964), Finnish classical guitarist
Timo Koskinen (born 1965), Finnish classical pianist
Timo Kotipelto (born 1969), Finnish metal singer
Timo Lavikainen (born 1972), Finnish actor
Timo Maas (born 1969), German electronic musician and DJ
Timo K. Mukka (1944–1973), Finnish novelist
Timo Parvela (born 1964), Finnish children's writer
Timo Räisänen (born 1979), Swedish musician
Timo Rautiainen (musician) (born 1963), Finnish metal singer
Timo Rose (born 1977), German filmmaker and rapper
Timo Salminen (born 1952), Finnish cinematographer
Timo Tolkki (born 1966), Finnish metal musician
Timo Toots (born 1982), Estonian artist
Timo Torikka (born 1958), Finnish actor
Timo Vuorensola (born 1979), Finnish film director and actor

Politics and government
Timo Angelov (1882–1903), Macedonian revolutionary
Timo Kalli (born 1947), Finnish politician
Timo Laaninen (born 1954), Finnish politician
Timo Soini (born 1962), Finnish politician

Science and academia
Timo Airaksinen (born 1947), Finnish philosopher
Timo Hannay (born 1968), English science writer and businessman
Timo Honkela (born 1962), Finnish information scientist
Timo Joensuu (born 1957), Finnish oncologist
Timo Kivimäki (born 1962), Finnish political scientist
Timo Maran (born 1975), Estonian biosemiotician and poet
Timo Meynhardt (born 1972), German psychologist and business economist
Timo Penttilä (1931–2011), Finnish architect
Timo Santalainen (born 1946), Finnish business professor and consultant
Timo Penttilä (1926–2006), Finnish designer, sculptor, and professor
Timo Sirainen (born 1979), Finnish programmer and scientist
Timo Teräsvirta (born 1941), Finnish economist
Timo Vihavainen (born 1947), Finnish historian and professor of Russian studies

Sports

Association football
Timo Achenbach (born 1982), German defender
Timo Askolin (born 1951), Finnish manager
Timo Baumgartl (born 1996), German defender
Timo Beermann (born 1990), German defender
Timo Brauer (born 1990), German midfielder
Timo Çeçen (born 1994), German midfielder
Timo Furuholm (born 1987), Finnish forward
Timo Gebhart (born 1989), German midfielder
Timo Hammel (born 1987), German goalkeeper
Timo Heinze (born 1986), German defender
Timo Hildebrand (born 1979), German goalkeeper
Timo Horn (born 1993), German goalkeeper
Timo Kern (born 1990), German midfielder
Timo Kunert (born 1987), German midfielder
Timo Lange (born 1968), German midfielder and coach
Timo Letschert (born 1993), Dutch defender
Timo Liekoski (born 1942), Finnish goalkeeper and coach
Timo Nagy (born 1983), German midfielder
Timo Nummelin (born 1948), Finnish footballer and ice hockey player 
Timo Ochs (born 1981), German goalkeeper
Timo Perthel (born 1989), German wing-back
Timo Plattel (born 1994), Dutch goalkeeper
Timo Reus (born 1974), German goalkeeper
Timo Rost (born 1978), German midfielder
Timo Röttger (born 1985), German winger
Timo Scheunemann (born 1973), Indonesian-born German forward and manager
Timo Schultz (born 1977), German midfielder and coach
Timo Staffeldt (born 1984), German midfielder
Timo Uster (born 1974), Gambian defender
Timo Wenzel (born 1977), German defender
Timo Werner (born 1996), German forward
Timo Zahnleiter (born 1948), German midfielder and manager

Ice hockey
Timo Ahmaoja (born 1978), Finnish defenseman
Timo Blomqvist (born 1961), Finnish defenseman
Timo Helbling (born 1981), Swiss defenseman
Timo Hirvonen (born 1973), Finnish winger
Timo Jutila (born 1963), Finnish defenseman
Timo Koskela (born 1979), Finnish winger
Timo Lahtinen (born 1947), Finnish player and coach
Timo Lindström (born 1986), Finnish goaltender
Timo Meier (born 1996), Swiss winger
Timo Nummelin (born 1948), Finnish footballer and ice hockey player 
Timo Pärssinen (born 1977), Finnish forward
Timo Pielmeier (born 1989), German goaltender
Timo Salo (born 1985), Finnish forward
Timo Seppänen (born 1987), Finnish defenseman
Timo Susi (born 1959), Finnish player
Timo Sutinen (born 1949), Finnish player
Timo Turunen (born 1948), Finnish center

Motorsports
Timo Bernhard (born 1981), German racing driver
Timo Glock (born 1982), German racing driver
Timo Gottschalk (born 1974), German rally navigator
Timo Lienemann (born 1985), German racing driver
Timo Mäkinen (born 1938), Finnish rally driver
Timo Rautiainen (born 1964), Finnish rally driver
Timo Salonen (born 1951), Finnish rally driver
Timo Scheider (born 1978), German racing driver

Other sports
Timo Aaltonen (born 1969), Finnish shot putter
Timo Antila (born 1980), Finnish biathlete
Timo André Bakken (born 1989), Norwegian cross-country skier
Timo Boll (born 1981), German table tennis player
Timo Eichfuss (born 1988), Estonian basketball player
Timo Grönlund (born 1954), Finnish sprint canoer
Timo Hoffmann (born 1974), German boxer
Timo Karppinen (born 1967), Finnish orienteer
Timo Kuusisto (born 1959), Finnish pole vaulter
Timo Lumme (born 1961), Finnish International Olympic Committee employee
Timo Murama (1913–1981), Finnish Nordic combined skier
Timo Nieminen (born 1981), Finnish tennis player
Timo Peltola (born 1972), Finnish judoka
Timo Pérez (born 1975), Dominican Republic baseball player
Timo Roosen (born 1993), Dutch cyclist
Timo Saarelainen (born 1960), Finnish basketball player
Timo Sild (born 1988), Estonian orienteer
Timo Simonlatser (born 1986), Estonian cross-country skier
Timo Tammemaa (born 1991), Estonian volleyball player
Timo Tompuri (born 1969), Finnish discus thrower
Timo Weß (born 1982), German field hockey player

Other
Timo Saarnio (born 1944), Finnish interior architect and furniture designer
Tim Weiland, American fashion designer also known as Timo

People nicknamed Timo
Tim Anderson (RAF officer) (born 1957)
Friedhelm Konietzka (1938–2012), German football striker and manager

Fictional characters
Timo Mendes, from the German soap opera Verbotene Liebe

See also
Timmo Niesner (born 1971), German actor
Rick Timmo (born 1947), New Zealand motorcycle racer
Tim (given name)

Lists of people by nickname